William Wallace Burns McInnes (April 8, 1871 – August 4, 1954) was a Canadian politician, lawyer and served as the fifth commissioner of Yukon.

Born in Dresden, Ontario, the son of Thomas Robert McInnes, McInnes entered the University of Toronto at the age of 14 and graduated in 1889, the youngest graduate to that date. After studying at Osgoode Hall, he was called to the British Columbia Bar in 1893 and practiced law in Nanaimo and Vancouver.

A member of the Liberal Party of Canada, McInnes won the federal constituency of Vancouver in 1896 and sat in the House of Commons of Canada in Ottawa. In 1900, he represented Port Alberni in the British Columbia Legislature for five years. In Victoria, he served as provincial secretary and Minister of Education.

On May 27, 1905, McInnes was appointed to the office of Commissioner in the Yukon Territory. His term in office was said to be one of reform and stability, in contrast to the term of his predecessor, Frederick Tennyson Congdon. He was said to be one of the most popular politicians in the Yukon in the early 1900s. However, on December 31, 1906, McInnes had resigned and looking to sit once again in the House of Commons. J. T. Lithgow took over as Acting Commissioner until a successor to McInnes could be appointed. McInnes never again sat in the House. He tried in 1908, 1917 and 1921, only to be defeated on all occasions.

In 1909, McInnes became a judge when he was appointed to the County Court of Vancouver between 1909 and 1917. He served as police magistrate for ten years, beginning in 1944, and was known for the severity of his sentences.

William Wallace Burns McInnes died in Vancouver in 1954.

References
 William Wallace Burns McInnes at The Canadian Encyclopedia
 
 History of the Yukon Commissioners

External links
 

1871 births
1954 deaths
British Columbia Liberal Party MLAs
Commissioners of Yukon
Liberal Party of Canada MPs
Members of the House of Commons of Canada from British Columbia
University of Toronto alumni